Events from the year 1546 in Ireland.

Incumbent
Monarch: Henry VIII

Events
February 7 – John Bathe becomes Principal Solicitor for Ireland.
May 30 – Cornelius O'Dea is nominated by Henry VIII as first Church of Ireland Bishop of Killaloe (consecrated 12 July).
October 28 – Thomas Butler, 10th Earl of Ormond succeeds the earldom following the death of his father James. 
Sir John Alan, Lord Chancellor of Ireland, is removed from office by the Privy Council of England on a complaint of corruption, and Sir Richard Reade is sent to Dublin to replace him.

Births
Possible date – Thomas Field, Jesuit explorer (d. 1625)

Deaths
October 28 – James Butler, 9th Earl of Ormonde (b. c.1515)

References

 
1540s in Ireland
Ireland
Years of the 16th century in Ireland